The kneeling position is a position for rifle shooting. There are no longer international competitions in pure kneeling shooting, but it is included as the last part of 300 metre rifle three positions, 300 metre standard rifle and 50 metre rifle three positions.

References
 

Shooting positions
Kneeling